The Swimming Federation of Bosnia and Herzegovina (Bosnian, Croatian and Serbian: Plivački savez Bosne i Hercegovine / Пливачки савез Босне и Херцеговине) is the governing body of swimming in Bosnia and Herzegovina. It is a non-profit organization that was founded on 1 December 2002 at a meeting at the Olympic Committee of Bosnia and Herzegovina. It is both a member of LEN and FINA.

Member clubs
 there are 15 member clubs.

 PK Borac, Banja Luka
 APK 22. april, Banja Luka
 PK Banja Luka, Banja Luka
 PK Mladost, Banja Luka
 PK Olymp, Banja Luka
 PK Vrbas, Banja Luka
 PK Savski galeb, Brčko

 PK Lisičići, Konjic
 PK Delfin, Laktaši
 PK Galeb-Gikil, Lukavac
 PK Velež, Mostar
 PK Bosna, Sarajevo

 PK Leotar, Trebinje
 Gradski Klub Vodenih Sportova "Jedinstvo"Tuzla
 PK Aquatech, Tuzla
 PK Sloboda, Tuzla
 PK Zmaj-Alpamm, Tuzla
 PK Željezara, Zenica

References

External links

Plivački savez Bosne i Hercegovine (official website)

Plivački savez Bosne i Hercegovine (old site) (old website)

Bosnia
SWim